25I may refer to any of the following novel phenethylamine compounds:

25I-NBOMe (2C-I-NBOMe)
25I-NBOH
25I-NBF
25I-NBMD